Sengoku 2 is a beat 'em up arcade game. It is the second game of the Sengoku series by SNK. It was ported to the Neo Geo and Neo Geo CD consoles. In 2009 the series was compiled on a CD titled Sengoku Anthology for the PlayStation 2 and Windows. The Neo Geo version was re-released on the Japanese Virtual Console in November 8, 2012 and for the PAL region on February 7, 2013. In 2017, the game was re-released as part of the ACA Neo Geo series for the Xbox One, followed by the PlayStation 4, and also on the Nintendo Switch and Windows 10 via Steam the following year.

Gameplay 

The gameplay is similar to Sengoku, except that the playable character is constantly armed with a sword for they which can initiate wide plane attacks and vertical slashes. Pressing both attack buttons together allows the character to block or dodge attacks. Another button combo gets the character to perform a special trick attack. The character can also jump and do jump attacks. Occasionally the character would be mounted on horseback and have to carefully hack and slash enemies during a canter.

The player can transform the character into three different forms including, the armour-clad wolf, the shuriken-throwing ninja and the staff-wielding Tengu warrior for a limited time. Various collectible orbs heal the character's health or enhance the character's attack abilities and that of the different forms' capabilities.

Plot 

An evil warlord is intent on conquering the world, this time by the use of time travel to conquer every known important event in history. The two protagonists from the previous game, Ninja Dave and Cowboy Kev, are sent by a priestess from the past to battle the warlord's forces to restore the world's ages and ensure the warlord's conquest never succeeds.

Development

Release

Reception 

Sengoku 2 has been met with positive reception from critics and reviewers alike since its release.

Notes

References

External links 
 Sengoku 2 at GameFAQs
 Sengoku 2 at Giant Bomb
 Sengoku 2 at Killer List of Videogames
 Sengoku 2 at MobyGames

1993 video games
ACA Neo Geo games
Arcade video games
SNK beat 'em ups
Cooperative video games
D4 Enterprise games
Hack and slash games
Multiplayer and single-player video games
Neo Geo games
Neo Geo CD games
Nintendo Switch games
PlayStation Network games
PlayStation 4 games
Side-scrolling beat 'em ups
SNK Playmore games
Virtual Console games
Video game sequels
Windows games
Xbox One games
Video games developed in Japan
Hamster Corporation games